Mickowsee is a lake in Mecklenburg-Vorpommern, Germany. At an elevation of 15.3 m, its surface area is 0.61 km².

External links 
 

Lakes of Mecklenburg-Western Pomerania